The 2002 Green Flag MSA British Touring Car Championship season was the 45th British Touring Car Championship (BTCC) season which began at Brands Hatch on 1 April and concluded at Donington Park on 22 September.

Changes for 2002

Teams and drivers
The second season of BTC-T rules in the top class saw two new manufacturer backed teams enter, with Honda returning and Proton entering for the first time.

Reigning champions Vauxhall again entered four Triple 8-run Vauxhall Astra Coupes. With reigning champion Jason Plato not returning, 2001 runner-up Yvan Muller was partnered by James Thompson in the Vauxhall Motorsport entries while Thompson's place in the Egg Sport entry was taken by Matt Neal, fresh from a season in the European Touring Car Championship, alongside Production class graduate Paul O'Neill.

MG, who had trialled their West Surrey Racing-prepared ZS in the closing stages of 2001 retained experienced touring car hand Anthony Reid and Warren Hughes at the wheel.

After a year absence Honda returned with a pair Honda Civic Type-R's prepared by Arena Motorsport, who had previously entered as an independent in 1999. Guernseyman Andy Priaulx, who crossed over from Formula 3 after impressing on a one off BTCC outing for Vauxhall in 2001, was signed alongside Northern Irishman Alan Morrison, the 2000 Production (then Class B) champion.

In late 2001 it was announced that Proton would enter a pair of manufacturer backed cars backed by Petronas and run under the Petronas Syntium Proton - Team [PSP] banner.  Jason Plato was initially linked with the drive before Scottish veteran David Leslie and Phil Bennett, who had been dropped by Vauxhall, were officially announced.

With Peugeot withdrawing their factory backing, Vic Lee Racing now headed the independents class, which was reinstated after a 1-year hiatus, with their pair of 406 Coupes, Dan Eaves remained and was joined by 1992 champion Tim Harvey, moving across from JSM. The pair were joined later in the year by Formula Renault championship winner Carl Breeze in a third car.

The works MG squad was supported from second meeting onwards by a WSR-run satellite team carrying the name of the girl band Atomic Kitten as part of a sponsorship deal. This team ran the young pairing of Fiesta racer Colin Turkington and Production graduate Gareth Howell.

Barwell Motorsport stepped up from the Production class to complete the Touring grid with a pair of ex-works Vauxhall Astra Coupes driven by New Zealand superbike racer Aaron Slight, who switched to car racing after a successful guest appearance for Peugeot in 2001, and 17-year-old rookie Tom Chilton.

In the Production class Synchro Motorsport gained the upper hand by stepping up from the Honda Accord to the brand new Civic Type R, recruiting former Honda factory driver James Kaye from Barwell alongside the returning Dave Allan.

The Accords were still campaigned by new squad Beacon Motorsport with Lotus Elise championship graduates Mark Thomas and Spencer Marsh, and John Batchelor's team swapped from Integras to a pair of Accords for Jim Edwards Jnr and Batchelor (again under the name of John B-and-Q), who was injured in a crash during the second meeting at Oulton Park and replaced by Peter Cate and later Hyla Breese.

Tech-Speed Motorsport continued their Peugeot 306 campaign, with Lotus Elise champion Mark Fullalove replacing Vauxhall-bound Paul O'Neill alongside Annie Templeton, and GA Motorsport also returned with their Alfa Romeo 156s, this time campaigned by series newcomers Graham Saunders and Alan Blencowe, accompanied by 2001 driver Gavin Pyper at circuits with enough grid space to accommodate a third car. Pyper received a race ban following an incident at Thruxton and his car was driven by former Ford and Volvo driver Kelvin Burt.

Rob Collard also returned in his self-entered Renault Clio but did not contest a full programme.

The big new arrival to the class was Edenbridge Racing's pair of BMW 320is, driven by teenager Tom Boardman in his second year in the class, and experienced German production saloon racer Norman Simon who had raced in the European Super Production championship in 2001.

TH Motorsport also appeared at selected rounds with a Mitsubishi Carisma for Steve Wood.

Other changes
 Number of race weekends reduced from 13 to 10
 ITV took over terrestrial broadcasting rights from the BBC
 Greenflag took over as title sponsor from AA.

Trivia 
 Hyla Breese became the first driver in the championship's history to end the season with a negative points score after collecting 20 penalty points for engine changes taking is final tally to -16.

Teams and drivers
† Not eligible for points.

Race calendar and winners
All races were held in the United Kingdom (except Mondello Park which was held in Ireland).

Championship results tables

No driver may collect more than one "Lead a Lap" point per race no matter how many laps they lead.

Touring Class (BTC-T)

Note: bold signifies pole position in class (1 point awarded all races), italics signifies fastest lap in class (1 point awarded all races) and * signifies that driver lead feature race for at least one lap (1 point given).
† Not eligible for points.

Independent's Championship

Manufacturers Championship

Touring Teams Championship

Production Teams Championship

References 

2002 Season
Touring Car Championship